Iryna Alyaksandrauna Kurachkina (born 17 June 1994) is a Belarusian freestyle wrestler. She won the silver medal in the women's 57 kg event at the 2020 Summer Olympics held in Tokyo, Japan. She is also a two-time bronze medalist at the World Wrestling Championships and a four-time medalist, including two golds, at the European Wrestling Championships. She also won the gold medal in her event at the 2019 European Games held in Minsk, Belarus.

Career 

She competed in the women's 51 kg event at the 2013 World Wrestling Championships held in Budapest, Hungary. In March 2016, she won the silver medal in the women's 53 kg event at the European Wrestling Championships held in Riga, Latvia. The next month, she competed in the qualification tournament held in Ulaanbaatar, Mongolia hoping to qualify for the 2016 Summer Olympics in Rio de Janeiro, Brazil. She did not advance far as she was eliminated in her first match.

At the 2017 World U23 Wrestling Championship held in Bydgoszcz, Poland, she won the silver medal in the women's 55 kg event. She also won one of the bronze medals in the women's 55 kg event at the 2017 World Wrestling Championships held in Paris, France. In 2018, she competed in the women's freestyle event of the 2018 Wrestling World Cup. A few months later, she won the gold medal in the women's 55 kg event at the 2018 European Wrestling Championships held in Kaspiysk, Dagestan, Russia. Later that year, she competed in the women's 57 kg event at the 2018 World Wrestling Championships held in Budapest, Hungary where she was eliminated in her first match.

At the 2019 European Games held in Minsk, Belarus, she won the gold medal in the women's 57 kg event. In the final, she defeated Mimi Hristova of Bulgaria. At the 2019 World Wrestling Championships held in Nur-Sultan, Kazakhstan, she won one of the bronze medals in the women's 57 kg event. She qualified at this competition to represent Belarus at the 2020 Summer Olympics in Tokyo, Japan.

In 2020, she won the gold medal by defeating Annika Wendle of Germany in the final of the women's 55 kg event at the Individual Wrestling World Cup held in Belgrade, Serbia. In 2021, she won the gold medal in the 57 kg event at the European Wrestling Championships held in Warsaw, Poland. A few months later, she won the silver medal in her event at the 2021 Poland Open held in Warsaw, Poland.

With a bronze medal and a third place win at the 2019 World Wrestling Championships, Kurachkina qualified for the Tokyo 2020 Olympics as the number #3 seed.  In Kurachkina's Olympic debut, she defeated, reigning Asian Champion, India's Anshu Malik by the score 8-2 after going all six-minutes; Kurachkina then went on to win 6-3 over 2016 Olympic Silver medalist, Valeria Koblova, representing the ROC, which would give Kurachkina a place in the semi-final. Opposing Kurachkina in the semi-final was unseeded Evelina Nikolova, who Kurachkina defeated by 11-0 technical superiority.

In 2022, she won one of the bronze medals in the 57 kg event at the Yasar Dogu Tournament held in Istanbul, Turkey.

Achievements

References

External links 

 

Living people
1994 births
Belarusian female sport wrestlers
World Wrestling Championships medalists
European Wrestling Championships medalists
European Games gold medalists for Belarus
Wrestlers at the 2019 European Games
Sportspeople from Mogilev Region
European Games medalists in wrestling
Wrestlers at the 2020 Summer Olympics
Medalists at the 2020 Summer Olympics
Olympic wrestlers of Belarus
Olympic silver medalists for Belarus
Olympic medalists in wrestling
European Wrestling Champions
21st-century Belarusian women